France is set to participate in the Eurovision Song Contest 2023 in Liverpool, United Kingdom, with the song "", written by Fatima Zahra Hafdi, Ahmed Saghir, Yannick Rastogi, and Zacharie Raymond. The song is performed by La Zarra. The French broadcaster  internally selected the French entry for the contest, delegated by the television channel .

As a member of the "Big Five", France automatically qualifies to compete in the final of the Eurovision Song Contest.

Background 

France's fifth victory came in  when Marie Myriam won with the song "". In , the nation finished in twenty-fourth place with the song "" performed by Alvan and Ahez.

The French national broadcaster, broadcasts the event within the country and delegates the selection of the nation's entry to the television channel . The French broadcaster has used both national finals and internal selections to choose the country's entry in the past.

Before Eurovision

Internal selection 
Initially,  announced in July 2022 that the French entry for the Eurovision Song Contest 2023 would be selected via the national final  However, on 12 January 2023, it was reported that the national final had been cancelled, and soon later the broadcaster announced that it had internally selected La Zarra, a Canadian singer and songwriter of Moroccan descent based in France, as the French entrant for the contest. Her competing song, "", written by Ahmed Saghir, Yannick Rastogi, Zacharie Raymond, and La Zarra herself, was presented to the public on 19 February 2023 during a pre-recorded showcase performance, broadcast on  during the programme  and hosted by Laurent Delahousse. The French Head of Delegation for the Eurovision Song Contest, Alexandra Redde-Amiel, commented on the selection:

At Eurovision 
According to Eurovision rules, all nations with the exceptions of the host country and the "Big Five" (France, Germany, Italy, Spain, and the United Kingdom) are required to qualify from one of two semi-finals in order to compete in the final; the top ten countries from each semi-final progress to the final. As a member of the "Big Five", France automatically qualified to compete in the final on 13 May 2023. In addition to its participation in the final, France was also required to broadcast and vote in one of the two semi-finals. This was decided via a draw held during the semi-final allocation draw on 31 January 2023, when it was announced that France would be voting in the first semi-final.

References

External links 

 Official France 2 Eurovision site

2023
Countries in the Eurovision Song Contest 2023
Eurovision
Eurovision